Giorgio Venturin (born 9 July 1968) is an Italian former professional footballer who played as a central or defensive midfielder.

Career 
Venturin started his playing career in the Torino youth system, and was subsequently loaned to Serie B side Cosenza for a season in 1988. He returned to Torino in 1989, making 28 appearances and scoring a single goal. After a single season at Napoli, he returned once again to Turin and played three seasons with the granata. During his stay with Torino, he received his one and only cap with the Italian team in 1992; he appeared as a second half substitute for Luca Fusi in Italy's 2–0 friendly win over Republic of Ireland at the Foxboro Stadium in the 1992 U.S. Cup, on 4 June. In 1994 he moved to Lazio, where he played until January 1999, except for a loan spell at Cagliari in 1995. He left Lazio to join La Liga side Atlético Madrid during the 1998–99 winter transfer market. He returned to Italy in 2000 to play for his boyhood club Torino. He finally left Torino in 2002 to sign for Taranto, and retired in 2005 after  seasons with Lodigiani and its successor Cisco Lodigiani of Serie C2. After retiring, he became involved with the Cisco Roma (ex-Cisco Lodigiani) youth system.

References

External links 
 Giorgio Venturin at FootballPlus.com
 
 Giorgio Venturin at FIGC.it  

1968 births
Living people
People from Bollate
Cosenza Calcio 1914 players
Atlético Madrid footballers
Cagliari Calcio players
Association football midfielders
Expatriate footballers in Spain
Italian expatriate footballers
Italian footballers
Italy international footballers
Italy under-21 international footballers
La Liga players
S.S. Lazio players
S.S.C. Napoli players
A.S. Lodigiani players
Atletico Roma F.C. players
Serie A players
Serie B players
Serie C players
Taranto F.C. 1927 players
Torino F.C. players
Footballers from Lombardy
Sportspeople from the Metropolitan City of Milan